James Francillon (1802–1866), was an English barrister and legal writer.

Life
Francillon was the sixth son of Francis Francillon of Harwich, Essex, born 21 November 1802. He was educated at the King's School, Rochester, served his articles and was admitted an attorney. He then entered a Gray's Inn, and was called to the bar there in 1833.

He went the Oxford circuit, enjoyed a fair practice, but was chiefly employed in chamber work. In 1847, when the new county courts were constituted, he was appointed judge for the Gloucestershire district. He was also a magistrate for Gloucestershire and Wiltshire, and deputy-chairman of the Gloucestershire quarter sessions.

Francillon, who was married and had issue, died in Lausanne of cholera 3 September 1866.

Works
He wrote 'Lectures, Elementary and Familiar, on English Law,’ first and second series, 1860–1.

References

Attribution

1802 births
1866 deaths
English barristers
19th-century English judges
English legal writers
People from Harwich
Deaths from cholera
English male non-fiction writers